Sahand University of Technology (SUT) (Danushgah-e Sân'ti-ye Sihend) Sahand University of Technology (SUT) as the first technical university in Iran after Islamic revolution was established in 1989 in Osku County, SUT located in the north-west hub of industries and endeavors to fulfill the essential needs either for educating high skilled committed engineers, researchers, and scientists for performing research and development projects. SUT offers over 20 BSc programs and more than 100 graduate programs of study in engineering, science and technology, which are consistent with the needs of the region and the country.

More than half of students are enrolled in post-graduate programs including MSc and PhD which highlights SUT’s particular attention and enthusiasm to research. The university was proud to innovate and establish the first self-funded demand-driven research centers being independent of the governmental funds. 

At the moment, 32 research centers in various areas including Petroleum and Gas, Advanced Materials, Polymer, Environment, Nanotechnology, Stem Cells, Renewable Energy, ICT, Biotechnology, Mineral Processing, Structures, Automotive, Medical Engineering and Productivity are focusing on the national and international industrial problems.

400 research projects have been conducted in line with industry’s needs, as well as participation into dozens of major national projects, including increasing oilfield extraction coefficients, building solar power plants, producing biotechnology products, and registering several international and more than 200 national patens are another successful accomplishment of SUT. The publication of high quality articles also shows the effective role of these centers in the frontiers of knowledge.

An excellence pole of styrenic polymers is the only active scientific hub in the field of polymer engineering in the northwestern region of the country, which focuses on research in the fields of polymers and styrene materials and interdisciplinary approaches supported by prominent experts of the country.

The University Innovation and Entrepreneurship Center houses dozens of knowledge-based companies and technology units to complete the cycle from ideas to products and their commercialization. In this center, kind of products and/ or technologies have been produced and/or developed / that are exported to foreign countries. The university is also proud to create and host the country's first cyber park for the development and commercialization of information and communication technology, which is being launched with the participation of the private sector.

More recently, SUT appreciate international scientific collaboration via either enhancing or launching memorandum of understanding with foreign universities in order to establish the framework of admitting international students, and conducting joint research projects amongst science and technology disciplines.

In addition to extensive educational and research activities, Sahand University of Technology has created cultural, sports, welfare, and health facilities for students. Creating vitality and hope by implementing various scientific, cultural and entertainment programs through the participation of the students is an integral part of the university's educational and research programs.

Furthermore, SUT’s academic staff and students have been awarded many national and international prizes and distinctions including Energy Globe World award, Green Productivity Specialist of APO, the country top professor award in 2010 and 2018, the country top researcher award in 2011 and 2017, the Iranian academy of science distinguished young researcher awards in 2011 and 2017, membership of 7 faculty members in specialized higher education committees of the country, as well as numerous student rewards received by student teams in nation-wide science and sport competitions.

On the base of the Shanghai Ranking Report, SUT has been ranked among the top 150 or 200 universities in the field of metallurgical engineering, among the top 400 universities in the field of chemical engineering, and among the top 500 universities in science and energy engineering from 2018 to 2020 in a row.

History
Sahand University of Technology (SUT) as the first technical university in Iran after Islamic revolution was established in 1989 in Tabriz, the capital of art and technology in Iran.  SUT located in the north-west hub of industries and endeavors to fulfill the essential needs either for educating high skilled committed engineers, researchers, and scientists for performing research and development projects. SUT offers over 20 BSc programs and more than 100 graduate programs of study in engineering, science and technology, which are consistent with the needs of the region and the country.

Academics
At the moment, 32 research centers in various areas including Petroleum and Gas, Advanced Materials, Polymer, Environment, Nanotechnology, Stem Cells, Renewable Energy, ICT, Biotechnology, Mineral Processing, Structures, Automotive, Medical Engineering and Productivity are focusing on the national and international industrial problems.

List of Departments
 Faculty of Basic Sciences for Engineering
 Faculty of Chemical Engineering 
 Faculty of Civil Engineering
 Faculty of Electrical Engineering 
 Faculty of Materials Engineering 
 Faculty of Mechanical Engineering 
 Faculty of Mining Engineering 
 Faculty of Polymer Engineering
 Faculty of Petroleum Engineering
 Faculty of Biomedical Engineering

Research Centers 
Research Center for Polymeric Materials, Sahand University of Technology
 Biotechnology Research Center, Sahand University of Technology
 Petroleum Research Center, Sahand University of Technology
 Reactor & Catalysis Research Center, Sahand University of Technology
 Environmental Engineering Research Center, Sahand University of Technology
 Nanotechnology Research Center, Sahand University of Technology
 ICT Research Center, Sahand University of Technology
 Research Center of Advanced Materials, Sahand University of Technology
 Hydrometeorology & Seismic Engineering Research Center???????, Sahand University of Technology

See also
 List of Iranian Research Centers
 List of colleges and universities by country
 List of colleges and universities
 Higher education in Iran
List of universities in Iran
 Academy of Gundishapur
 Nizamiyyah
 Darolfonoon
 List of Iranian scientists from the pre-modern era.
 Modern Iranian scientists and engineers
 Education in Iran
 National Library of Iran

References

External links
Official web site of SUT
http://sut.ac.ir/public/showpage.aspx?id=29

Universities in Iran
Buildings and structures in East Azerbaijan Province
Educational institutions established in 1989
Education in Tabriz
1989 establishments in Iran